Fifty Shades Darker is a 2012 erotic romance novel by British author E. L. James. It is the second installment in the Fifty Shades trilogy that traces the deepening relationship between a college graduate, Anastasia Steele, and a young business magnate, Christian Grey. The first and third volumes, Fifty Shades of Grey and Fifty Shades Freed, were published in 2011 and 2012, respectively. The novel is published by Vintage Books and reached No. 1 on the USA Today best seller list.

Plot
Three days after leaving Christian, Anastasia "Ana" Steele begins her job as personal assistant to Jack Hyde, an editor at Seattle Independent Publishing (SIP). He asks Ana out often which, though it makes her uneasy, she writes off.  Later, Christian emails her about a gallery exhibit José Rodriguez started in Portland, which she'd forgotten. Ana and Christian attend the show together and kiss in an alley. The same night, they have dinner in a restaurant and Christian reveals he wants her any way possible. He later asks that they resume their relationship but under Ana's conditions: no rules and no punishments. She agrees.
 
Christian reveals to Ana that he bought SIP but that the deal must stay secret for another month. Feeling he is interfering in her career, especially after he freezes the company's accounts preventing her from going on an overnight business trip to New York with Jack, Ana finds it annoying. Christian insists his actions were for her own protection because Jack is a "known philanderer" who has apparently harassed his last five assistants. Christian's concerns prove correct when Jack corners Ana after hours and blackmails her, demanding sexual favors. Ana escapes using her self-defense training, and Christian has Jack fired and confiscates his work computer.
 
Meanwhile, when attending a masquerade ball at the home of Christian's parents, Ana meets Christian's ex-lover Elena Lincoln (whom Ana nicknames Mrs. Robinson) and discovers that Elena and Christian own a salon business together. Later, Ana is auctioned off and Christian bids $100,000 for the first dance with her. Ana is disgusted to learn that Christian continues to be friends with Elena, the woman who seduced him when he was only 15 years old and introduced him to the BDSM lifestyle. When Elena realizes that Christian sees Ana as a girlfriend and not a submissive, she becomes antagonistic towards Ana, trying to sow discord in the budding relationship.
 
Meanwhile, Ana is stalked at work by a disturbed Leila Williams, one of Christian's former submissives, a situation made more intense when Ana learns Leila has a gun. Leila's obsession with Christian and Ana began after she left her husband four months before, leading to a mental breakdown. Leila breaks into Ana's apartment and threatens her at gunpoint. Christian defuses the situation by using their dominant/submissive dynamic, leaving Ana worried that Christian cannot be satisfied with a vanilla relationship. Ana confronts Christian about Leila. Fearing Ana is leaving him again, Christian impulsively puts out his marriage proposal. Ana does not answer, claiming she needs time to consider it.
 
José, whom Christian still views as a romantic rival, drives to Seattle to visit Ana, which Christian only permits if they both stay at Escala. Ana becomes worried on the night before Christian's 28th birthday when he goes missing flying from Portland to Seattle in his helicopter with Ros Bailey. However, he eventually makes it back to Escala safely, explaining that both the helicopter's engines failed; sabotage is suspected. Ana realizes she never wants to be without him and accepts his marriage proposal.
 
The next day, the Grey family throws Christian a large birthday party at their mansion. Ana's friend Kate worries after finding an email between Ana and Christian, discussing the BDSM contract, but Ana assures her that her relationship with Christian is a vanilla one. After Christian and Ana announce their engagement, Elena, who is still in love with Christian, angrily confronts Ana, accusing her of being a gold-digger and claiming that a vanilla relationship will never satisfy Christian. Enraged, Ana throws her drink at Elena and tells her to mind her own business. As they fight, Christian comes in and confronts Elena. He reminds her that while Elena taught him how to take control of his own life, she never once taught him to love like Ana did. Christian's adoptive mother, Grace, overhears the argument and is furious that Elena preyed on her teenage son. After slapping her across the face, Grace rails at Elena for her actions and orders her out of her family's life for good. She leaves in disgrace and Grace confronts Christian about it. After telling Grace the whole story, he decides to end his business relationship with Elena and give back the salon to her.
 
Christian takes Ana to the boathouse, which has been decorated with flowers and soft lights. He proposes properly with a ring and Ana accepts. Outside the Greys' mansion, Jack Hyde secretly watches the party; he is the one who sabotaged Christian's helicopter and he has sworn revenge.

Characters

Reception
The novel reached No. 2 on the USA Today best seller list and is considered by The Guardian to be No. 11 on the Top 100 Bestselling Books of All Time in the United Kingdom.

Film adaptation

In March 2014, the producer for the eponymous film adaptation of Fifty Shades of Grey, Dana Brunetti, had said there were, as of then, no solid plans to make a sequel. That film was released on 13 February 2015. Before the first film premiered, there was still high anticipation from fans for the sequel to the film. After the first film premiered at a special fan screening in New York City on 6 February 2015, director Sam Taylor-Johnson confirmed two sequels to be succeeded after the first film, with Fifty Shades Darker to be released in 2016. Principal photography commenced in June 2015 in Vancouver, British Columbia, Canada. In April 2015, at the Universal CinemaCon in Las Vegas, Universal announced the release dates of the film along with its sequel. The film is scheduled to be released on 10 February 2017. The first still from the film was released on Friday, 24 April 2015, showing Jamie Dornan as Christian Grey in a black mask looking into a mirror. In April 2015, Universal Pictures chairman Donna Langley told The Hollywood Reporter that the second instalment will be "more of a thriller". In November 2015, Universal Studios announced that both films will be shot back-to-back with principal photography scheduled to commence in early 2016. Filming began in Canada on 9 February 2016 and continued through 12 July 2016. On 28 January 2016, producer Charolette McKinney broke ground on the new project, and it was announced that Kim Basinger would play Elena Lincoln.

See also

 BDSM in culture and media
 Sadism and masochism in fiction

References

External links
 Official author page

2012 British novels
British erotic novels
British novels adapted into films
British romance novels
Fifty Shades novels
Works based on Twilight (novel series)
Novels set in Portland, Oregon
Novels set in Seattle
Women's erotica and pornography